Sveta Planina is a settlement in the Municipality of Trbovlje in central Slovenia. It lies in the hills northwest of the town of Trbovlje. The area is part of the traditional region of Styria. It is now included with the rest of the municipality in the Central Sava Statistical Region.

Name
The name of the settlement was changed from Sveta Planina (literally, 'holy mountain pasture') to Partizanski vrh (literally, 'Partisan peak') in 1955. The name was changed on the basis of the 1948 Law on Names of Settlements and Designations of Squares, Streets, and Buildings as part of efforts by Slovenia's postwar communist government to remove religious elements from toponyms. The name Sveta Planina was restored in 2002. In the past the German name was Heilige Alpe.

Church
The local parish church, built on a hill northeast of the main settlement, is dedicated to the Holy Name of Mary and belongs to the Roman Catholic Archdiocese of Ljubljana. It dates to the late 18th century.

References

External links

Sveta Planina on Geopedia

Populated places in the Municipality of Trbovlje